Dalniye Zelentsy is a rural locality (an inhabited locality) in Teribersky Territorial Okrug of Kolsky District of Murmansk Oblast, Russia, located on the Kola Peninsula beyond the Arctic Circle at a height of  above sea level. Population: 52 (2010 Census).

References

Notes

Sources

Rural localities in Murmansk Oblast